Pensions Branch is a  long 1st order tributary to the Hyco River in Halifax County, Virginia.  This is the only stream of this name in the United States.

Course
Pensions Branch rises in a pond about 1 mile north of Larrys Store, Virginia and then flows generally north with curves to join the Hyco River about 2 miles south-southeast of Omega.

Watershed
Pensions Branch drains  of area, receives about 45.6 in/year of precipitation, has a wetness index of 410.25, and is about 52% forested.

See also
List of rivers of Virginia

References

Rivers of Virginia
Rivers of Halifax County, Virginia
Tributaries of the Roanoke River